Sneznik may refer to:

Děčínský Sněžník, a mountain in the Czech Republic, near Děčín
Králický Sněžník, a mountain in the Eastern Sudetes on the border of the Czech Republic and Poland 
Śnieżnik Mountains, a mountain range in the Eastern Sudetes on the border of the Czech Republic and Poland 
Snežnik, the highest peak of the Dinaric Alps in Slovenia
 Snežnik Castle, near Kozarišče in Loška Dolina, Slovenia
Snezhnika, a glacieret in the Pirin Mountains of Bulgaria